"Stars" is a song by British soul and pop band Simply Red, released in November 1991 as the second single from their fourth album of the same name (1991). Written by lead singer Mick Hucknall and produced by Stewart Levine, it became the first single from the album to crack the UK top 10, reaching number eight in December 1991. Outside the UK, "Stars" reached the top 10 in Denmark, Italy, Luxembourg and Zimbabwe and peaked within the top 40 in more than 10 other countries. In the United States it climbed to number 44 on the Billboard Hot 100, marking the band's last appearance on the listing, and reached number eight on the Billboard Adult Contemporary chart.

Q Magazine included "Stars" in their list of the "1001 Best Songs Ever" in 2003. The song was featured on the band's compilation albums, Greatest Hits in 1996, Simply Red 25: The Greatest Hits in 2008 and Song Book 1985–2010 in 2013.

Chart performance
"Stars" was a major hit in Europe, becoming one of Simply Red's most successful songs. It was a top 10 hit in Denmark (9), Italy (2), Luxembourg (4) and the United Kingdom, where the single peaked at number eight in its third week on the UK Singles Chart. Additionally, it entered the top 20 in Austria (18), Belgium (16), Germany (19), Ireland (13), the Netherlands (15) and Switzerland (11). And it was a top 30 hit in France (24) and a top 40 hit in Sweden (32). On the Eurochart Hot 100, "Stars" peaked at number 19 on January 18, 1991. 

Outside Europe, the single reached number eight in Zimbabwe, number 17 in Canada, number 29 in Australia, number 32 in New Zealand and number 44 on the US Billboard Hot 100. In 2013, the song again charted, this time in Japan, where it peaked at number 49 on the Japan Hot 100. "Stars" received a gold record in the United Kingdom, with sales and streams of over 400,000 units.

Critical reception
AllMusic editor Jon O'Brien described the song as "wistful dreamy". Billboard magazine viewed it as a "midtempo crooner". Jan DeKnock from Chicago Tribune felt that the group's "move into a funkier groove" suited them well, especially on the "charmingly upbeat" "Stars" and "Something Got Me Started". Writing for CultureSonar in 2018, Ellen Fagan wrote, "This exquisite ballad references a couple who love one another but are unlikely to walk off into the sunset together for various reasons. Because of that, both are destined to walk away reeling. The video released with the song is a vintage '80s masterpiece of surrealism; the whole package emerges as a mournful tune with a yearning, otherworldly feel." A reviewer from Dundee Courier deemed it a "slowie". Dave Tianene from Milwaukee Sentinel remarked that the song features "a delicately soulful vocal". 

Pan-European magazine Music & Media found that it has numerous allusions, including references to Mick Hucknall's own road to fame and to the stars in the European flag. They added, "This soulful pop song confirms the position of the red-headed singer at the top, close to the galactic stars." In an retrospective review, Pop Rescue stated that Hucknall "hits those notes with perfection in the chorus, resulting in a wonderfully warm and catchy track." Karla Peterson from The Press-Courier declared it as "swooning" and "one of the most open-hearted love songs Hucknall has ever written." In 2014, Luke Turner from The Quietus remarked that the song itself "holds up wonderfully", adding that "there's not a huge amount going on, but that's what makes it work: piano, terrific drums, layers of vocals, and a load of bonus hints of chorus snuck in amongst the verses." Richard Paton from Toledo Blade complimented it as a "soulful groove". Johnny Dee from Smash Hits said it is "superb".

Music video
The accompanying music video for "Stars" was released in November 1991 and features Hucknall wandering around a desert surrounded by large gold stars with close-ups of him and a woman. It was directed by Zanna and edited by Marc Eskenazi.

Track listings
 7-inch and cassette single
 "Stars" – 4:08
 "Stars" (PM-ized mix) – 4:12

 12-inch single
A1. "Stars" (Comprende mix)
A2. "Stars" (PM-ized mix)
B1. "Ramblin' on My Mind"
B2. "Something Got Me Started" (Hurley's house mix)

 CD single
 "Stars"
 "Ramblin' on My Mind"
 "Stars" (Comprende mix)
 "Something Got Me Started" (Hurley's house mix)

Credits and personnel
Credits are lifted from the Stars album booklet.

Studios
 Recorded at Condulmer Recording Studio (Venice, Italy)
 Mixed at Conway Studios (Los Angeles)
 Mastered at Bernie Grundman Mastering (Los Angeles)

Simply Red
 Mick Hucknall – words, music, vocals, backing vocals, co-production
 Fritz McIntyre – additional vocals, keyboards
 Tim Kellett – keyboards
 Heitor Pereira – guitars
 Ian Kirkham – saxophone
 Gota Yashiki – drums, percussion, programs
 Shaun Ward – bass guitar

Other personnel
 Stewart Levine – production
 Daren Klein – mixing, engineering
 Sandro Franchin – assistant engineering
 Marnie Riley – assistant mix engineering
 Bernie Grundman – mastering

Charts and certifications

Weekly charts

Year-end charts

Certifications

References

1990s ballads
1991 singles
1991 songs
Music videos directed by Zanna (director)
Pop ballads
Simply Red songs
Songs written by Mick Hucknall